Lisa Lockerd Maragakis is an infectious disease specialist and professor with dual appointments, both at the Johns Hopkins School of Medicine and Johns Hopkins Bloomberg School of Public Health. She is also Senior Director of Infection Prevention at the Johns Hopkins Health System as well as the hospital epidemiologist.  She is also a designated representative to the Healthcare Infection Control Practices Advisory Committee (HICPAC) at the Department of Health and Human Services.

Maragakis earned her medical degree at the John’s Hopkins School of Medicine.

Publications
 COVID-19 Vaccines: Myth Versus Fact

References

Johns Hopkins Bloomberg School of Public Health faculty
American women epidemiologists
American epidemiologists
Johns Hopkins School of Medicine alumni
Living people
Year of birth missing (living people)
21st-century American scientists
21st-century American women scientists